The 2016 World Junior Speed Skating Championships took place from 11 to 13 March 2016 in Changchun, China. They were the 43rd World Junior Speed Skating Championships.

Medal summary

Men

Women

References

External links
Official Website

World Junior Speed Skating Championships
2016 in speed skating
2016 in Chinese sport
International speed skating competitions hosted by China
Sport in Changchun
2016 in youth sport